The 2015 Grand Prix de Denain was the 57th edition of the Grand Prix de Denain cycle race and was held on 16 April 2015. The race started and finished in Denain, and was won by Nacer Bouhanni.

Results

References

2015
2015 in road cycling
2015 in French sport